The Horatio and Laura Allen Farm is a historic farm property located in Duvall, Washington. It was listed on the National Register of Historic Places on March 22, 2002.

See also
 Historic preservation
 History of agriculture in the United States
 National Register of Historic Places listings in King County, Washington

References

External links 
 
 

Bungalow architecture in Washington (state)
National Register of Historic Places in King County, Washington